Robert N. Mullin (1893–1982) was a writer of Western history and the author of several publications about Billy the Kid, and the Lincoln County War.

Family

Robert Norville Mullin was the son of Joseph P. Mullin and Charlotte Norville.  He married Josephine Plumridge in 1916.

Career

In his early career, Robert N. Mullin lived in Toledo, Ohio, and was a senior executive of a Chicago oil company.

Publications

 Tombstone A.T. : business section, May 1882, by Robert N. Mullin, 1950
 New Light on the Legend of Billy the Kid, New Mexico Folklore Record, 6 (1953), 1-5. Philip J. Rasch and Robert N. Mullin.
 Dim Trails: The Pursuit of the McCarty Family, New Mexico Folklore Record, 8 (1954), 6-11.  Philip J. Rasch and Robert N. Mullin.
 A Chronology of the Lincoln County War : scene: Mostly Lincoln County, New Mexico, time: mainly 1877-1881, by Robert N. Mullin, 1966
 The Boyhood of Billy the Kid, by Robert N. Mullin, 1967
 The Key to the Mystery of Pat Garrett, by Robert N. Mullin, 1969
 The Strange Story of Wayne Brazel, by Robert N. Mullin, 1970
 An Item from old Mesilla, by Robert N. Mullin, 1971
 Tombstone, Arizona Territory, circa 1881-82, by Robert N. Mullin, 1971
 Stagecoach Pioneers of the Southwest, by Robert N. Mullin, 1983

References

External links
 Worldcat Overview & works, Robert N. Mullin (Robert Norville Mullin)
 Robert N. Mullin Collection at the Hayley Memorial Library & History Center, Midland, Texas
 

1893 births
1982 deaths